"I Love You for All Seasons" is a song written by Sheila Young and performed by The Fuzz. The song was featured on their 1971 album, The Fuzz.
The song was produced by Carr-Cee Productions.

Chart performance
It reached #10 on the U.S. R&B chart, #21 on the Billboard Hot 100 in 1971, and #43 in Canada and #100 in Australia.

The single ranked #45 on the Billboard Year-End Hot 100 singles of 1971.
ist

Sampled versions
Brand Nubian sampled the song on their song "What the Fuck..." from their 1994 album, Everything Is Everything.
21 Savage sampled a cover of the song by East of Underground on his single A Lot from his album I Am > I Was

References

External links
 Lyrics of this song
 

1970 songs
1970 singles
The Fuzz (band) songs
Calla Records singles